Donald William Dykes (8 June 1930 – 25 October 2016) was an English professional footballer who made 95 appearances in the Football League playing for Lincoln City. He played as a wing half.

Life and career
Dykes was born in Ashby by Partney, Lincolnshire, and began his football career with village club Metheringham. He signed for Lincoln City of the Third Division North, having been spotted when he played in a charity match against them during the 1948–49 season; he also attracted an offer from Second Division Leicester City. He made his senior debut in August 1949, and went on to play 101 matches, scoring four times, in all competitions. Dykes moved into non-league football with Boston United in 1959. In the first of his two seasons with the club, he played 53 matches in all competitions.

Dykes died in Lincoln in 2016 at the age of 86.

References

1930 births
2016 deaths
People from Spilsby
English footballers
Association football wing halves
Lincoln City F.C. players
Boston United F.C. players
English Football League players
Southern Football League players